Germán Chávez (born 5 May 1943) is a Mexican water polo player. He competed in the men's tournament at the 1968 Summer Olympics.

References

1943 births
Living people
Mexican male water polo players
Olympic water polo players of Mexico
Water polo players at the 1968 Summer Olympics
Sportspeople from Mexico City